Statistics of Mexican Primera División in season 1975-76.

Overview

Tecos was promoted to Primera División.

This season was contested by 20 teams, and América won the championship.

Atlante was relegated to Segunda División.

Teams

Group stage

Group 1

Group 2

Group 3

Group 4

Results

Relegation playoff

Atletico Potosino won 2-1 on aggregate. Atlante was relegated to Segunda División.

Championship Playoffs

Bracket

QuarterfinalAmérica won 1-0 on aggregate.Unión de Curtidores won 4-2 on aggregate.UdeG won 6-0 on aggregate.Monterrey won 7-2 on aggregate.Semi-finalsAmérica won 2-0 on aggregate.UdeG won 3-2 on aggregate.FinalAmérica won 4-0 on aggregate.''

References
Mexico - List of final tables (RSSSF)

Liga MX seasons
Mex
1975–76 in Mexican football